The Bob Willis Trophy is a domestic first-class cricket competition in England and Wales for the eighteen first-class counties, organised by the England and Wales Cricket Board (ECB).

It was established in the 2020 English cricket season. The tournament was named the Bob Willis Trophy in honour of former England cricket captain and fast bowler Bob Willis, who died in December 2019.

While in 2020 it was promoted as being a one-off competition, the Bob Willis Trophy was contested again in 2021 as a five-day final between the top two teams in County Championship Division One. In January 2022, the ECB announced that the Bob Willis Trophy would not be played to end that year's championship; managing director of county cricket Neil Snowball said that the ECB was discussing the future format of the trophy with Willis's family.

Results

References

English domestic cricket competitions
English cricket in the 21st century
2020 establishments in the United Kingdom
First-class cricket competitions
Recurring sporting events established in 2020
Professional sports leagues in the United Kingdom